Cheung Ka-wai also as Ka Wai Cheung (born 17 February 1999) is a snooker player from Hong Kong.

Career

Amateur
In 2015, Cheung won the IBSF World Under-18 Snooker Championship
On 4 March 2015 it was announced that Cheung was invited to play in the 2016 World Snooker Championship qualifiers.

In 2022, Cheung won the gold medal at the World Games in Birmingham, Alabama, defeating Abdelrahman Shahin 3–1 in the final.

Career finals

Non-ranking finals: 1 (1 title)

Amateur finals: 3 (2 titles)

Team finals: 1 (1 title)

References

Hong Kong snooker players
World Games gold medalists
1999 births
Living people